Shane Coley is an American practical sport shooter who took overall silver at the 2014 IPSC Handgun World Shoot in the Handgun Open division. Shane started shooting in 2005 at the age of 14, and in 2009 he became a part of the United States Army Marksmanship Unit. In 2012 he became the overall USPSA Handgun Nationals Open division champion, making him the youngest USPSA National Champion after KC Eusebio.

References

Living people
IPSC shooters
IPSC World Shoot Champions
Year of birth missing (living people)
21st-century American people